Richard Sharp Smith House, now known as Stoneybrook, is a historic home located at Asheville, Buncombe County, North Carolina. It was designed and built by architect Richard Sharp Smith in 1902–1903. It is a -story, stone and stucco American Craftsman / bungalow style dwelling. It features a projecting front gable bay and leaded glass windows.

It was listed on the National Register of Historic Places in 2009.

References

External links

Houses on the National Register of Historic Places in North Carolina
Houses completed in 1903
Houses in Asheville, North Carolina
National Register of Historic Places in Buncombe County, North Carolina